Beta Carinae is the second-brightest star in the southern constellation of Carina. It has the official name Miaplacidus; Beta Carinae is the star's Bayer designation, which is Latinised from β Carinae and abbreviated Beta Car or β Car. With apparent magnitude of 1.68, it is one of the brightest stars in the night sky. It is the brightest star in the southern asterism known as the Diamond Cross, marking the southwestern end of the asterism. It lies near the planetary nebula IC 2448.

Nomenclature
β Carinae (Latinised to Beta Carinae) is the star's Bayer designation.

The star's historical name Miaplacidus made its debut on star maps in 1856 when the star atlas Geography of the Heavens, composed by Elijah Hinsdale Burritt, was published. The meaning and linguistic origin of the name remained an enigma for many decades, until William Higgins, a great scholar and expert on star names, surmised that the name Miaplacidus is apparently a bilingual combination of Arabic مياه miyāh for 'waters' and Latin placidus for 'placid'. The IAU Working Group on Star Names first bulletin of July 2016 included a table of the first two batches of names approved by the WGSN; which included Miaplacidus for this star.

Physical properties
The stellar classification of A1 III suggests this is an evolved giant star, although Malagnini and Morossi (1990) rated it as an A2 IV subgiant star. It has an estimated age of 260 million years. This star does not show an excess emission of infrared radiation that might otherwise suggest the presence of a debris disk. It has about 3.5 times the Sun's mass and has expanded to almost seven times the radius of the Sun.

References 

A-type giants
Carina (constellation)
Carinae, Beta
3685
CD-69 00600
Gliese and GJ objects
080007
045238
Miaplacidus